Samerberg is a municipality in the district of Rosenheim in Bavaria in Germany.

It consists of 78 hamlets and localities, none of them bearing the name Samerberg itself, the seat is in Törwang.

References

Rosenheim (district)